Hard Time for the Dreamer is the debut album by Shelly Poole, released on 26 September 2005, on Transistor Project Records.

Track listing
"Hard Time For The Dreamer"
"Totally Underwater"
"Little Wonder"
"Out In The Open"
"Don't Look That Way"
"Anyday Now" (featuring Jack Savoretti)
"If You Will Be Pilot"
"Lost In You"
"Lose Yourself"
"Hope" (featuring Jack Savoretti)

References

2005 debut albums